The 2013 3 Hours of Fuji was the second round of the 2013 Asian Le Mans Series season and the seventh points scoring race for GT300 cars in the 2013 Super GT season. It took place on September 22, 2013 at the Fuji Speedway in Oyama, Shizuoka, Japan.

Race result
Race result is as follows. Class winners in bold.

References

External links
 
Super GT official website 

Fuji 3 Hours
Fuji
Fuji